Aksoy is a Turkish surname. Notable people with the surname include:

Altan Aksoy (born 1976), Turkish footballer
Asuman Aksoy, Turkish-American mathematician
Behiye Aksoy (1933–2015), Turkish singer
Mehmet Aksoy (sculptor) (born 1939), Turkish sculptor
Muammer Aksoy (1917–1990), Turkish academic 
Seza Kutlar Aksoy (born 1945), Turkish children's author
Faruk Aksoy (born 1964), Turkish film director
Taşkın Aksoy (born 1967), German-Turkish footballer and manager
Vedat Aksoy (born 1988), Turkish para archer

Turkish-language surnames